Eduardo Mazzitelli (born 4 November 1952) is an Argentine  comics writer.

He was born in Lomas de Zamora, in the province of Buenos Aires. Most of his comic stories, usually belonging to the fantastic or science fiction genre, were drawn by artist Enrique Alcatena: their works in collaboration include Metallum Terra, Shankar, Hexmoor, Acero líquido and Pesadillas. Numerous of Mazzitelli's stories were published directly in Italian by Eura Editoriale, on its magazines Lanciostory or Skorpio.

External links
Page at Comiqueando website 
Interview to Eduardo Mazzitelli 

1952 births
Living people
People from Buenos Aires Province
Argentine comics writers